Infusion is an inverted steel roller coaster at Blackpool Pleasure Beach, Lancashire, England. It is a 689m standard "Mark 3" model Vekoma Suspended Looping Coaster (SLC) and the first to be suspended entirely over water.

History

Infusion was relocated from Pleasureland Southport, Blackpool Pleasure Beach's sister park, where it was known as "Traumatizer". The attraction first opened at its original location in 1999. When Pleasureland closed in 2006, the ride was moved to Pleasure Beach, where it has operated since 2007. The original ride featured a red track with teal supports; however, the track has since been repainted blue. The ride cost a total of £8 million to construct.

Characteristics

Infusion operates two seating trains. Each train has eight cars that seat two passengers, allowing a maximum capacity of 16 people per train. The track is approximately 2,260 feet long and the lift is 109 feet high. Infusion's maximum capacity is 832 passengers per hour.

Design & Layout

The ride begins with the train climbing a  lift hill before arching into a steep curved incline. The train rises up into a butterfly loop- two half loops connected by a corkscrew - before pulling upwards into a banked apex. From here the train drops sharply into a sidewinder - a loop that transitions into a corkscrew. A tight helix follows, providing a near miss with the Big Dipper, before the train straightens itself and pulls into a double inline twist. From here the train rolls into a 90 degree turn before pulling downwards and ascending into the brakes. Two 90 degree turns return the train to the station.

Marketing & Reception

The ride was the subject of a large marketing campaign and featured on BBC Newsround, the Daily Star and Daily Express newspapers and GMTV.

The ride has been used in television shows and advertisements. The ride was featured in a Specsavers advertisement when two elderly people rode the ride after mistaking the ride's seats for a park bench.

References

External links 

 Pleasure Beach, Blackpool website
 Press release
 BBC News "Pleasure Beach's New Thrill Ride

Steel roller coasters
Blackpool Pleasure Beach
Roller coasters in the United Kingdom
Roller coasters introduced in 2007